Iris domestica, commonly known as leopard lily, blackberry lily, and leopard flower, is an ornamental plant in the family Iridaceae. In 2005, based on molecular DNA sequence evidence, Belamcanda chinensis, the sole species in the genus Belamcanda, was transferred to the genus Iris and renamed Iris domestica.

Description
It has 3-5-stems and 8-14 leaves per stem growing in a fan, with flowers ascending proximally having orange-red scattered spots of darker pigment, blooming during summer. The seed pods open in the fall, showing clusters of black, shiny seeds whose resemblance to those of a blackberry gives the plant its common name, "blackberry lily". The plant is hardy to USDA plant hardiness zone 5 and is propagated by seeds or division.

In the wild, it grows in grasslands, pastures, forest clearings, meadows, and mountainous regions or shrublands. Although it has escaped cultivation in many regions, it is not considered to have potential as an invasive species.

Synonyms
Its synonyms are Epidendrum domesticum L., Vanilla domestica (L.) Druce, Belamcanda punctata Moench, Gemmingia chinensis (L.) Kuntze, Ixia chinensis L., Morea chinensis, and Pardanthus chinensis Ker Gawl.)

Distribution
The plant is native to Eastern Asia and has been cultivated worldwide in subtropical and temperate climates. Due to the ornamental value of its attractive flowers, the plant was distributed to Europe as early as the 18th century and the United States and Caribbean countries in the 19th century.

Uses
I. domestica is a common ornamental plant in private and public gardens, zoos, and floral displays. Its flowers provide nectar and pollen to insects and birds. The plant has been used in traditional medicine.

See also
 Dieffenbachia (leopard lily)
 List of plants known as lily

References

Bibliography

External links
  Belamcanda chinensis
Belamcanda chinensis at USDA PLANTS Database

domestica
Garden plants